Dubuisson may refer to:

Dubuisson (surname)
Dubuisson, Quebec or Val-d'Or, a city in Quebec, Canada
Dubuisson Brewery (Brasserie Dubuisson Frères) is a Belgian family brewery in Pipaix, province of Hainaut